Flinders Island is an island in the Investigator Group off the coast of South Australia approximately  west of mainland town Elliston.

It is part of the  Investigator Islands Important Bird Area and has a colony of little penguins, but has suffered from the feral cats, black rats and mice, which threaten the bird life. The island is privately owned and was used mostly for farming since 1911, although that tailed off as transport costs rose.

The island has been subject to diamond exploration following the discovery of a wide range of kimberlite indicator minerals there, which was continuing .

History

European discovery and use
Flinders named the island after his younger brother Samuel, who was the sloop's second lieutenant, on 13 February 1802. Flinders' expedition described some aspects of the island's flora and fauna. Lower land was covered with large bushes, unlike islands previously passed further north. There was very little of the white, velvety grass striplex or tufted wiry grass previously seen. A small macropod species was described as "numerous" and specimens were shot. There were a few small casuarinas growing on the island but firewood was scarce. The beaches were frequented by Australian sea lions, of which several family groups were closely inspected.

A sealing camp was in place on the south-east side of the island by the 1820s. There was also a whaling station. The sealers, their Aboriginal wives and children numbered up to twenty people at one stage. A pastoral survey of the site in 1890 identified ten separate structures associated with the sealing community, and archaeological examination of the structures took place in the 1980s. The Flinders Island Whaling and Sealing Site is listed on the South Australian Heritage Register.

Some time prior to 1911, sheep, horses, cattle, milk thistles and oats were introduced to Flinders Island, presumably by Willie Schlink and his family. At this time  of the island had been cleared and was producing 1,400 to 2,000 bags of wheat annually. 4,000 sheep were kept and black and white rabbits ran wild on the island. By the time of the island's sale in 1911, 30,000 wallabies had been killed there.  The island continued to be used mostly for farming, although that tailed off as transport costs rose. In the late 1970s, the island was bought by the Woolford family, who ran it as a sheep station for merinos. By 2020, there were only a few sheep and the island was used mainly for tourism (via house rental) and recreation.

Conservation
Flinders Island is one of the islands included in the Investigator Islands Important Bird Area identified by BirdLife International, a non-statutory status, awarded in 2009 because of the island group's population of fairy tern (a vulnerable species), as well as significant populations of Cape Barren geese, Pacific gull and black-faced cormorant. Other birds for which the IBA is significant include large numbers of breeding short-tailed shearwaters and white-faced storm-petrels. The biome-restricted rock parrot has been recorded from most islands in the group.

An account of Flinders Island's wildlife published in 1934 stated that penguins could "be seen waddling soldier-like among the rocks and cave entrances that constitute their homes". In 2006 there was an colony of little penguins believed to be "probably declining", with an estimated population of fewer than twenty birds, nesting at the base of some cliffs where feral cats have limited access. A risk assessment for the penguins commissioned by Department for Environment & Natural Resources in 2016 report based their recommendations on the 2006 estimate. It reported that the feral cats were responsible for the probable decline, but if they were eliminated, the rat population would grow, so both would need to be removed.

A strip of land along the north coast of the island extending west from the island’s most northerly headland, Point Malcolm, has been the subject of the subject of a heritage agreement as a protected area since 29 August 1995. Since 2012, the waters adjoining the Flinders Island  have been part of a habitat protection zone in the Investigator Marine Park.

The feral cats, black rats and mice, which threaten the bird life, need to be eradicated, and threatened animals will be introduced.

Mining exploration
The island has been subject to diamond exploration following the discovery of a wide range of kimberlite indicator minerals there, which was continuing .

Citations and references

Citations

References
	

Islands of South Australia
Great Australian Bight
Seal hunting
Whaling in Australia
Wildlife conservation
Private islands of Australia